Robert Cohen (born 15 June 1959) is a British concert cellist.

Early life and education
Cohen was born on 15 June 1959 in London to violinist Raymond Cohen and pianist Anthya Rael. Having begun playing the cello at age 5, at age 10 he entered the Purcell School for Young Musicians. He also began studies with William Pleeth. At age 12 he made his concerto debut at the Royal Festival Hall, where he performed the Boccherini Concerto in B flat. His Wigmore Hall recital debut followed at age 17. In 1975 he began studies at the Guildhall School of Music and Drama, he graduated with a postgraduate Diploma of Advanced Solo in 1977. During this period he also studied with Jacqueline du Pré, André Navarra and Mstislav Rostropovich.

Career
In 1976 he made his recording debut with the Elgar Cello Concerto and the London Philharmonic Orchestra, which went on to receive a Silver Disc for recording sales. In 1984 he bought a Stradivarius cello, the Bonjour, which he kept until 1993.
 
He has been invited to perform concertos by conductors Claudio Abbado, Antal Dorati, Sir Mark Elder, Mariss Jansons, Sir Charles Mackerras, Jerzy Maksymiuk, Kurt Masur, Riccardo Muti, Sir Roger Norrington, Tadaaki Otaka, Sir Simon Rattle, Stanisław Skrowaczewski, Michael Tilson-Thomas and Osmo Vanska. He has notably collaborated in chamber music with Yehudi Menuhin, Amadeus Quartet, Menahem Pressler, Leonidas Kavakos and Krystian Zimerman and with his regular duo partner pianist Heini Karkkainen.

From 2000 to 2012 Cohen was Professor of Advanced Solo Studies at the Conservatorio della Svizzera Italiana, Lugano. In 2010 he became a professor at the Royal Academy of Music. He gives masterclasses internationally and lectures on music preparation and performance techniques.

In 1989 he became artistic director of the Charleston Manor Festival. The final festival took place in the summer of 2012.

Cohen was the cellist of the Fine Arts Quartet from October 2011 until January 2018.

Composer Sally Beamish has dedicated two works to Cohen, the cello concertos 'River' (1997), inspired by the eponymous 1983 anthology by Ted Hughes, and 'Song Gatherer' (2009).

In 2000 he directed a series on Les Six as part of the City of London Festival.

In 2014 he created the ongoing monthly programme ‘On That Note’ with Milwaukee Public Radio (NPR), which discusses the life of a working classical musician.

In 2020 he became an Ambassador of the Tim Henman Foundation.

Personal life 
Married in 1987, Cohen lives with his wife in London. They have four sons.

Awards 
 Suggia Prize for potential soloists - annually 1967-1971.
Piatigorsky Prize, Tanglewood 1978.
 Winner of Young Concert Artists, New York 1978.
 Winner of Unesco International Competition, Czechoslovakia 1981.
 Honorary Member of the Royal Academy of Music (HonRAM) in 2009.
 Robert Helpmann Award, Australia 2005 - performing Brett Dean's 12 Angry Cellos.

Discography

References

External links 
 Interview with ICS (Internet Cello Society) by Tim Janof
 Charleston Manor Festival

1959 births
Living people
British classical cellists